Ralf Youtz  (born 1972) is an American musician. Youtz was the original drummer in the Boise, Idaho-based indie rock band Built to Spill. He appeared on their 1993 debut album, Ultimate Alternative Wavers. Youtz was replaced by Andy Capps after the album's release, although he would work with Martsch again with The Halo Benders. Youtz also had short stints with the bands Sone and The Feelings. Youtz played guitar and sang in Ape Shape, which opened for Built to Spill on several dates of their 2005 tour.  He also played bass in The No-No's.  His sister, Karena Youtz was married to Built to Spill frontman Doug Martsch. In 2019, Youtz joined the Last Regiment of Syncopated Drummers as a snare drummer.

Youtz is currently a Mathematics instructor at Portland Community College. Youtz teaches mainly Statistics.

External links 
 http://www.myspace.com/apeshape
 https://web.archive.org/web/20060720182640/http://epitonic.com/artists/thehalobenders.html
 https://web.archive.org/web/20060716051756/http://epitonic.com/artists/thefeelings.html
 http://www.lastregiment.com/index.php

1972 births
Living people
American rock drummers
Musicians from Idaho
People from Twin Falls, Idaho
Built to Spill members
20th-century American drummers
American male drummers
21st-century American drummers
20th-century American male musicians
21st-century American male musicians